The 1994 Virginia Cavaliers men's soccer team represented the University of Virginia during the 1994 NCAA Division I men's soccer season. It was the program's 55th season of existence, and their 41st season in the Atlantic Coast Conference. The team was led by future National Soccer Hall of Fame member, Bruce Arena and their current coach, George Gelnovatch was an assistant.

Schedule 

Source:

|-
!colspan=6 style=""| Regular season

|-
!colspan=6 style=""| ACC Tournament
|-

|-
!colspan=6 style=""| NCAA Tournament
|-

References 

1994
1994 Atlantic Coast Conference men's soccer season
1994 NCAA Division I Men's Soccer Tournament participants
1994
NCAA Division I Men's Soccer Tournament College Cup seasons
American men's college soccer teams 1994 season
1994 in sports in Virginia